Tales from the New Republic (1999) is an anthology of short stories set in the fictional Star Wars universe. The book is edited by Peter Schweighofer and Craig Carey.

Contents 
"Interlude at Darknell" by Timothy Zahn and Michael A. Stackpole (1 BBY)
Part One by Timothy Zahn
Part Two and Three by Michael A. Stackpole
Part Four by Timothy Zahn
"Jade Solitaire" by Timothy Zahn (17 ABY)
"Gathering Shadows" by Kathy Burdette (4 ABY)
"Hutt and Seek" by Chris Cassidy and Tish Pahl (8 ABY)
"The Longest Fall" by Patricia A. Jackson (3 ABY)
"Conflict of Interest" by Laurie Burns (7 ABY)
"No Disintegrations, Please" by Paul Danner (4-19 ABY)
"Day of the Sepulchral Night" by Jean Rabe (5 ABY)
"Uhl Eharl Khoehng" by Patricia A. Jackson; concerns Adalric Cessius Brandl (9 ABY)
"The Last Hand" by Paul Danner (4 ABY)
"Simple Tricks" by Chris Cassidy and Tish Pahl (12 ABY)

External links
Amazon listing
Official CargoBay listing

1999 anthologies
Star Wars Legends
Science fiction anthologies
Bantam Spectra books